Ex parte Vallandigham, 68 U.S. (1 Wall.) 243 (1864), is a United States Supreme Court case, involving a former congressman Clement Vallandigham of Ohio, who had violated an Army order against the public expression of sympathy for the Confederate States and their cause. Vallandigham was tried before a military tribunal by Major General Ambrose E. Burnside for treason after he delivered an incendiary speech at Mount Vernon; he then appealed the tribunal's verdict to the Supreme Court, arguing that he as a civilian could not be tried before a military tribunal.

In February 1864, the Supreme Court avoided ruling on the question by instead unanimously holding that they could not take appeals from military tribunals at all.

Background 

Clement Vallandigham, a member of the United States House of Representatives, was the acknowledged leader of the pro-Confederate faction known as Copperheads in Ohio. After General Burnside, commander of the Military District of Ohio, issued General Order Number 38, warning that the "habit of declaring sympathies for the enemy" would not be tolerated, Vallandigham gave a major speech (May 1, 1863) charging the war was being fought not to save the Union but to free blacks and enslave whites. To those who supported the war he declared, "Defeat, debt, taxation [and] sepulchres – these are your trophies." He also called for "King Lincoln's" removal from the presidency.

Accordingly, on May 5, Vallandingham was arrested as a violator of General Order No. 38. Vallandigham's enraged supporters burned the offices of the Dayton Journal, the local Republican newspaper. He was tried by a military court on 6–7 May (the court adjourning to let him obtain a lawyer), convicted of "uttering disloyal sentiments" and attempting to hinder the prosecution of the war, and sentenced to two years' confinement in a military prison. A Federal circuit judge upheld Vallandigham's arrest and military trial as a valid exercise of the President's war powers.

Despite repeated petitions, President Lincoln refused to repudiate Burnside's actions or release Vallandigham. In a letter written in response to one meeting of Albany Democrats, Lincoln explained his position:

However, in late May, Lincoln commuted Vallandigham's sentence to banishment to the Confederacy, from where (in July) he went to Canada.

Ruling 

Meanwhile, Vallandigham's lawyers appealed the military tribunal's decision to the Supreme Court. The Court issued a unanimous ruling in February 1864, refusing to address Vallandigham's main argument that the military tribunal lacked jurisdiction to try him. Instead, they said the Court was only authorized to take appeals as regulated by Congress – and Congress had never authorized them to take an appeal from a military tribunal. Accordingly, they denied Vallandigham's appeal for lack of jurisdiction.

After the war was over, the Court would again revisit this issue in Ex parte Milligan, a similar case where, instead of appealing his sentence by a military tribunal, Milligan would file for a writ of habeas corpus. Then, the court upheld Milligan and Vallandigham's claim that military tribunals lacked authority to try civilians when civil courts were open.

See also 
 Supreme Court cases of the American Civil War
 Ex parte Milligan

References

External links
 

United States Constitution Article Three case law
United States Supreme Court cases
United States Supreme Court cases of the Taney Court
Criminal cases in the Taney Court
1863 in United States case law
United States habeas corpus case law
United States separation of powers case law
Ohio in the American Civil War
Original habeas cases